"Just Believe in Love" is the 14th single by Zard and released 1 February 1995 under B-Gram Records label. The single debuted at #2 rank first week. It charted for 11 weeks and sold over 656,000 copies.

Track list
All songs are written by Izumi Sakai and arranges by Takeshi Hayama
Just Believe in Love
composer: Michiya Haruhata
the song was used in TBS drama Yureru Omoi as theme song
Ready, Go!
composer: Daria Kawashima
Just believe in love (original karaoke)

References

1995 singles
Zard songs
Songs written by Izumi Sakai
Japanese television drama theme songs
1994 songs
Songs written by Michiya Haruhata